Butler is a Legislative Assembly electorate in the state of Western Australia. The district is named for the outer northern Perth suburb of Butler, which falls within its borders.

Geography
Coming into effect after the 2013 election, the boundaries of Butler stretch from the coastal boundary of the City of Wanneroo to its northern and eastern limits, and comprised 546 km² of land otherwise bounded in the south by the Kinross east-west boundary fence, Burns Beach Road, Wanneroo Road, Flynn Drive, Old Yanchep Road and Neaves Road. Its boundaries included the outposts of Yanchep and Two Rocks, the populated suburbs of Butler, Jindalee, Clarkson, Merriwa and Ridgewood, the semi-rural localities of Carabooda, Neerabup, Nowergup, the growing locality of Alkimos and the largely unpopulated localities of Eglinton and Pinjar.

After the 2019 redistribution, the electoral district now consists of the following areas of Two Rocks, Yanchep, Egliton, Alkimos, Butler, Jindalee, Merriwa, Ridgewood and Nowergup with the boundaries of Butler stretching from the western coastal boundary of the City of Wanneroo to its northern limits of Two Rocks and bounded in the south by Hester Avenue and Wanneroo Road in the east.

History
Butler was created at the 2011 redistribution for the 2013 state election, essentially as Mindarie renamed; the locality of Mindarie was moved from the electorate and into the neighbouring district of Ocean Reef. The inclusion of the locality Banksia Grove accounting for continued population growth of the northern corridor in the Perth metropolitan area.

The district boundaries were redistributed in 2019 and saw the suburb of Quinns Rock being removed from the electoral district.

Members for Butler

Election results

References

External links
 WAEC district maps: current boundaries, previous distributions

Electoral districts of Western Australia